Velikoye is a rural locality (a village) in Prilukskoye Rural Settlement, Vologodsky District, Vologda Oblast, Russia. The population was 5 as of 2002.

Geography 
The distance to Vologda is 23 km, to Dorozhnoye is 8 km. Zaonikiyevo, Semyonkovo-2, Borilovo-2, Arkhipovo are the nearest rural localities.

References 

Rural localities in Vologodsky District